The 2013–14 Northern Arizona Lumberjacks men's basketball team represented Northern Arizona University during the 2013–14 NCAA Division I men's basketball season. The Lumberjacks were led by second year head coach Jack Murphy and played their home games at the Walkup Skydome. They were members of the Big Sky Conference. They finished the season 15–17, 12–8 in Big Sky play to finish in a three way tie for second place. They lost in the quarterfinals of the Big Sky Conference tournament to Northern Colorado.

Roster

Schedule

|-
!colspan=9 style="background:#003466; color:#FFCC00;"| Exhibition

|-
!colspan=9 style="background:#003466; color:#FFCC00;"| Non-conference regular season

|-
!colspan=9 style="background:#003466; color:#FFCC00;"| Big Sky regular season

|-
!colspan=9 style="background:#003466; color:#FFCC00;"| Big Sky tournament

References

Northern Arizona Lumberjacks men's basketball seasons
Northern Arizona